Hurricane Charlie was the deadliest tropical cyclone of the 1951 Atlantic hurricane season. The third named storm, second hurricane, and second major hurricane of the season, it developed from a tropical wave east of the Lesser Antilles. It moved briskly west-northwest, passing between the islands of Dominica and Guadeloupe. It strengthened to a hurricane in the eastern Caribbean Sea, and it struck Jamaica with winds near Category 3 intensity. It strengthened to a peak intensity of  prior to landfall on Quintana Roo, Yucatán Peninsula. It weakened over land, and it re-strengthened over the Gulf of Mexico before it made a final landfall near Tampico.

In its path, Charlie caused more than 250 deaths. The hurricane produced Jamaica's deadliest natural disaster of the 20th century, causing more than 152 deaths and $50,000,000 in damages. The hurricane was described as Tampico's worst tropical cyclone since 1936, and it caused more than 100 fatalities in the surrounding areas. Many bodies were not recovered after flooding.

Meteorological history

Operationally, the system was not detected until August 14, and it was believed to have been an area of low pressure when it moved through the eastern Caribbean. It moved to the west-northwest, and it slowly organized to a minimal tropical storm on August 14. Although Hurricane hunters reported winds of hurricane force in squalls, the system was discounted as an easterly wave. On August 15, Tropical Storm Charlie quickly intensified, attaining maximum sustained winds of  after passing through the Lesser Antilles. The small center of circulation passed between Dominica and Guadeloupe in the early morning hours.

Hurricane Charlie continued to strengthen, and it reached Category 2 status on August 17 as it moved quickly westward across the Caribbean Sea. The cyclone intensified as it made landfall south of Kingston, Jamaica with  sustained winds. On August 18, the hurricane left the island as a Category 1 hurricane, and it quickly re-intensified over water. It passed south of the Cayman Islands with  sustained winds. Later, it attained major hurricane status on August 19. The hurricane peaked at  just before hitting near Cozumel during the night, and it weakened as it crossed the Yucatán Peninsula on August 20.

Upon reaching the Gulf of Mexico, Charlie had weakened to a  hurricane. On August 21, it remained a Category 2 hurricane while crossing the Gulf of Mexico until 18 hours before landfall. Later, Charlie made landfall near Tampico with  sustained winds. The strongest winds were believed to have been north of the eye, and were unrecorded. The storm quickly weakened over land, and it dissipated on August 23 in the Mexican state of Tamaulipas.

Preparations
On August 15, the Weather Bureau office in San Juan issued hurricane warnings for the eastern Caribbean from Martinique to Antigua, while storm warnings were released for the rest of the Leeward Islands. Later, hurricane warnings were also issued for the northern Leeward Islands, and northeast storm warnings were released for Puerto Rico and the Virgin Islands. In advance of the hurricane, flights' scheduled departures for the Barbados region were delayed. On August 17, the Weather Bureau noted that the hurricane would affect Jamaica, though it was not expected to strengthen significantly; the agency also reported that the probabilities were equal for the cyclone to pass north or south of the island. Later, the cyclone was forecast to pass "over or just south" of the island; Jamaica was urged to prepare for the cyclone, and the hurricane was expected to strengthen as the forward motion decreased. On August 20, the cyclone was expected to affect the northern Yucatán Peninsula between Mérida and Campeche, and "extreme caution" was advised for the area.

The hurricane was also expected to re-strengthen prior to its second landfall in Mexico, though the Weather Bureau also noted that there was a chance for the storm to affect Texas. Although the possibility never materialized, the agency expected rain bands and rough seas to affect southern Texas, and small watercraft were urged to remain in ports until the hurricane moved inland. On August 21, the cyclone was expected to move ashore between Nautla and Tuxpan, though it eventually made landfall further north near Tampico. Local officials expressed concerns about residents in huts and other vulnerable structures. In the Harlingen Valley region of southern Texas, precautionary measures were taken and Red Cross divisions organized a meeting at the local city hall. City departments and facilities were ready for disposal if the cyclone moved closer to the area. The cyclone's rains were also expected to impact unpicked cotton plants in the region. In advance of the storm, a Coast Guard plane dropped messages from the air to several vessels, advising them to seek shelter. In Tampico, oil industries erected barriers to protect fields, and authorities planned to evacuate residents from the surrounding low-lying areas. Thousands of residents stayed in refugee centers on elevated ground.

Impact
The cyclone was compact when it moved through the Lesser Antilles, and the strongest winds on land in the eastern Caribbean islands did not exceed . A hangar and installations were destroyed at Palisadoes Airport, and the facility received "extensive damage." Consequently, "At Memphis, Tenn, Chicago & Southern Airline headquarters here reported that its north and southbound Constellation flights were unable to land at Kingston, bypassing the airport there on flights between Chicago and Caracas." Several ships were sunk or overturned during the storm. Communications and power services were disrupted, suspending information from the island's interior. The hurricane also cut communications from the island to radio stations in the United States. 70–80 percent of the island's banana crops were destroyed, in addition to 30 percent of other crops. 70 convicted felons also escaped from a jail when winds blew down walls. Flooding was expected in the island's mountainous interior because of heavy precipitation. Heavy rains caused rock slides, damaging roads, railroads, and other sources of tourism. In Kingston, electricity was initially restored to essential services, including "hospitals, refrigerating plants, pumping stations and newspaper plants." Charlie caused around $50 million (1951 USD, $380 million 2005 USD) in crop and property damage, 152 deaths, injured 2,000, and left 25,000 homeless.

On the Yucatán Peninsula, Charlie destroyed up to 70% of the crops, though no loss of life was reported in the area. Unofficially, one person was reportedly killed on the peninsula. The winds toppled several thatched homes on Cozumel. The storm was reported to be the worst in Tampico since 1936. The winds uprooted trees and destroyed telephone poles, and damages to corn crops were believed to exceed $500,000. At least 300 residences were "damaged or destroyed." Outside the city, Charlie's heavy rain led to bursting dams and flooded rivers, where upward of 100 people died. In the city, four people died, and property losses were estimated near $1,160,000.

The hurricane's outer fringes produced swells along the Texas coast, and swimmers were advised to be cautious because of hazardous conditions. The conditions snarled marine operations in the area, and three fishermen were missing during the squall. On August 23, Brownsville experienced gusts of  when the hurricane struck the coast further south.

Aftermath
In the wake of this storm, Jamaica formed a new governmental entity known as the Hurricane Housing Organization. In 1956, this organization merged with the Central Housing Authority to become the Department of Housing.

References in Popular Culture
Lord Beginner wrote a calypso song about the hurricane's landfall in Jamaica entitled "Jamaica Hurricane".

See also

Hurricane Allen (1980)
Hurricane Gilbert (1988)
Hurricane Emily (2005)
Hurricane Dean (2007)
List of Atlantic hurricanes

References

Sources

1951 meteorology
Charlie
Charlie
Charlie (1951)
Charlie
Charlie
Charlie
Charlie
Charlie
Charlie (1951)